John Thornton Kirkland (August 17, 1770 – April 26, 1840) was an American Congregational clergyman who served as President of Harvard University from 1810 to 1828. As an undergraduate, he was a member of the Hasty Pudding.  He is remembered chiefly for his lenient treatment of students.  Kirkland House, one of Harvard's undergraduate "houses," or residence halls, was named in his honor.

Biography
John and his twin brother, George, were born at Herkimer, New York, August 17, 1770. Their parents were Rev. Dr. Samuel Kirkland and his wife, Jerusha Bingham Kirkland. She was a niece of Rev. Eleazar Wheelock, D. D.

Oliver Wendell Holmes describes him thus, in his study of Ralph Waldo Emerson: "His 'shining morning face' was round as a baby's, and talked as pleasantly as his voice did, with smiles for accents and dimples for punctuation.... It was of him that the story was always told,--it may be as old as the invention of printing,--that he threw his sermons into a barrel, where they went to pieces and got mixed up, and that when he was going to preach he fished out what he thought would be about enough for a sermon, and patched the leaves together as he best might."

His contemporary George Ticknor described Kirkland's sermons as "full of intellectual wealth and practical wisdom, with sometimes a quaintness that bordered on humor."

Kirkland served as pastor of the New South Church in Boston, 1794–1810. He was elected a Fellow of the American Academy of Arts and Sciences in 1799.
Kirkland was a founding member of the American Antiquarian Society in 1812.
His wife Elizabeth Cabot was the daughter of Congressman George Cabot.

References

External links
 Biography and summary of presidency, part of a series of Harvard's Unitarian Presidents

1770 births
1840 deaths
Presidents of Harvard University
Fellows of the American Academy of Arts and Sciences
Members of the American Antiquarian Society
Hasty Pudding alumni
Phillips Academy alumni